Physics education in the United Kingdom is mostly carried out from the ages of 16 to 18 at secondary schools, or sixth forms, and to a higher level across the Physics departments at British universities.

Nations

England

Physics is an 'enabling subject'. The IOP Future Physics Leaders scheme is funded by the DfE for schools in low participation areas.

Female participation

At 16, Physics is the second most popular subject for boys, but the 18th most popular for girls. 2% of females, and 6.5% of males choose Physics at A-level.

University
47 universities offer Physics courses accredited by the IoP. Scottish universities have four-year BSc undergraduate courses or five-year MPhys/MSci undergraduate courses with integrated masters.

Of those with Physics A-level, around 3,000 take Physics on an undergraduate course, followed by Mechanical Engineering and Mathematics, both just under 3,000; next is Civil Engineering, just over 1500.

There were around 710 PhD Physics research degrees a year in 2009-10, with the researchers being 435 from the UK, 110 from the EU, and 135 from overseas; 165 were female (around 20%).

After university, around 55% do a further degree, and 1.7% start a PGCE; 25% go into the private sector.

Results by LEA in England

Highest number of entries for Physics A-level
 Hampshire 840
 Kent 760
 Hertfordshire 748
 Surrey 626
 Essex 506
 Birmingham 505
 Lancashire 488
 Buckinghamshire 479

Publications
 Physics Education by the IOP

See also
 European Physical Society (based in France), which offers physics outreach, and works heavily with the International Association of Physics Students, producing the European Journal of Physics on Physics teaching (published by IOP Publishing)
 List of physics concepts in primary and secondary education curricula
 The Physics Teacher, an American publication

References

Physics education in the United Kingdom